Shastri Bhavan is a government building situated in New Delhi. 
This building is named after India's second Prime Minister Lal Bahadur Shastri. This large sprawling building houses a number of Ministries of Government of India like Human Resources Development, Law & Justice, Information & Broadcasting, Corporate Affairs, Chemicals and Petrochemicals, Culture, Women & Child Development etc.
This large building houses Govt offices for Ministries of Education, Petroleum & Natural Gas, Chemicals and Fertilizers, Youth Affairs, Social Justice & Empowerment, Family welfare etc.

External links

References

Government buildings in Delhi